The Megabús is a bus rapid transit system that serves the cities of Pereira and Dosquebradas in Colombia. The Megabús covers most parts of the cities using Av. 30 de Agosto and Av. del Ferrocarril in Pereira, and Av. Simon Bolívar in Dosquebradas. Carrera 6ta, Carrera 7ta, Carrera 8ta, Carrera 10ma, Calle 13ra and Calle 24ta are also used. The system opened on August 21, 2006 using only Line 3. Line 1 and Line 2 were opened on October 23, 2006. The provisional Intercambiador (Transfer Station) in Dosquebradas was opened in 2007 and the final one in the Cuba neighborhood of Pereira in August 2008.

Structure
The system is similar to TransMilenio in Bogotá. An additional set of regular buses, known as alimentadores (feeders), carries users from certain important stations to different locations that the main route does not reach.  Unlike the main TransMilenio buses, feeders are not operated with dedicated lanes, are not articulated, and are yellow (regular Megabús buses are green). There is no additional fare in order to use the feeder buses.

Stations

External links

Official web site of Megabús

Bus rapid transit in Colombia
Pereira, Colombia
2006 introductions